Danci may refer to:

Places
 Danci, Bosnia and Herzegovina, a village near Kakanj
 Danci, Croatia, a village near Vižinada

People
Cristian Danci (born 1988), Romanian footballer